Crossroads of the World is an outdoor shopping mall in Los Angeles.

Crossroads of the World may also refer to:

Times Square, a major commercial intersection in New York City
Gander International Airport, an airport located in Gander, Newfoundland and Labrador